Shepherd Hill, Shepherd's Hill or Shepherds Hill may refer to:

Shepherd Hill (New York), an elevation in Oneida County, New York
Shepherd Hill, Virginia, an unincorporated community in Virginia, U.S.
Shepherd Hill Regional High School, a school in Dudley, Massachusetts, U.S.
Shepherd's Hill Academy, a school in Martin, Georgia, U.S.
Shepherds Hill Radar Station RAAF, a radar station in Australia